Grant McCasland (born October 14, 1976) is an American college basketball coach, currently head coach for North Texas of Conference USA. McCasland joined the Mean Green in 2017 from Arkansas State, where he led the program for the 2016–17 season. He had previously been an assistant at his alma mater Baylor and as head coach at Midwestern State and Midland College.

Head coaching record

Personal life
McCasland is a Christian. McCasland is married to Cece McCasland. They have four children together.

References

External links
North Texas Mean Green bio

1976 births
Living people
American men's basketball coaches
American men's basketball players
Arkansas State Red Wolves men's basketball coaches
Basketball coaches from Texas
Basketball players from Texas
Baylor Bears men's basketball coaches
Baylor Bears men's basketball players
College men's basketball head coaches in the United States
Junior college men's basketball coaches in the United States
Midwestern State Mustangs men's basketball coaches
North Texas Mean Green men's basketball coaches
Point guards